Dana Haidar Touran (born January 30, 1993) is a  Jordanian  of Circassian ancestry  taekwondo practitioner. She won the silver medal at the 2010 Asian Games Taekwondo Competition.

References

External links
 
  

1993 births
Living people
Asian Games silver medalists for Jordan
Medalists at the 2010 Asian Games
Asian Games medalists in taekwondo
Taekwondo practitioners at the 2010 Summer Youth Olympics
Taekwondo practitioners at the 2010 Asian Games
Taekwondo practitioners at the 2014 Asian Games
Jordanian female taekwondo practitioners
World Taekwondo Championships medalists
Asian Taekwondo Championships medalists
21st-century Jordanian women